Arthur Burbidge (1836 – 18 December 1890) was an English cricketer. Burbidge's batting style is unknown. He was born at Camberwell, Surrey.

Burbidge made his first-class debut for Surrey against Cambridgeshire in 1857 at Fenner's, before playing in the return fixture between the two sides at The Oval. He later made two further appearances in first-class cricket, for the Gentlemen of the North against the Gentlemen of the South in 1861 and for the Gentlemen of the South against the Gentlemen of the North in 1862. In his four first-class matches, Burbidge scored 54 runs at an average of 7.71, with a high score of 13.

He died at Swanage, Dorset on 18 December 1890. His brother Frederick also played first-class cricket.

References

External links
Arthur Burbidge at ESPNcricinfo

1836 births
1890 deaths
People from Camberwell
English cricketers
Surrey cricketers
Gentlemen of the South cricketers
Gentlemen of the North cricketers